The Stanley Arms is a public house at 295 Liverpool Road, Eccles, Salford M30 0QN.

It is on the Campaign for Real Ale's National Inventory of Historic Pub Interiors.

The Stanley Arms is owned by Joseph Holt's Brewery of Manchester, and is a small pub with a friendly atmosphere.

References

Pubs in Greater Manchester
National Inventory Pubs
Buildings and structures in the City of Salford
Eccles, Greater Manchester